Eric Gable (born October 28, 1967) is an American soul/R&B singer. From 1988 to 1994, he released three studio albums, being signed on Orpheus Records/Epic Records, and had a number-one R&B hit "Remember (The First Time)". Another single, "Process of Elimination", peaked at number sixty-three in the UK Singles Chart in March 1994, his only UK chart entry.

Discography

Charting singles

References

External links
Eric Gable discography at AllMusic
Eric Gable at Discogs

Living people
1967 births
American soul singers
American male singers